The Legend of Zelda: Twilight Princess is a 2006 action-adventure video game developed and published by Nintendo for the GameCube and Wii. Originally planned for release exclusively on the GameCube in November 2005, Twilight Princess was delayed by Nintendo to allow its developers to refine the game, add more content, and port it to the Wii. The Wii version was a launch game in North America in November 2006, and in Japan, Europe, and Australia the following month. The GameCube version was also released in December 2006 as the final first-party game for the console.

The story focuses on series protagonist Link, who tries to prevent Hyrule from being engulfed by a corrupted parallel dimension known as the Twilight Realm. To do so, he takes the form of both a Hylian and a wolf, and he is assisted by a mysterious imp named Midna. The game takes place over a century after Ocarina of Time, in an alternate timeline from The Wind Waker.

Twilight Princess was critically acclaimed upon its release, received numerous game of the year awards, and has been called one of the greatest games of all time. By 2015, it had sold 8.85 million copies worldwide, making it the best-selling Zelda game until being overtaken by Breath of the Wild in April 2018. In 2011, the Wii version was rereleased under the Nintendo Selects label. A high-definition remaster for the Wii U, The Legend of Zelda: Twilight Princess HD, was released in March 2016.

Gameplay

The Legend of Zelda: Twilight Princess is an action-adventure game focused on combat, exploration, and puzzle-solving. It uses the basic control scheme introduced in Ocarina of Time, including context-sensitive action buttons and L-targeting (Z-targeting on the Wii), a system that allows the player to keep Link's view focused on an enemy or important object while moving and attacking. Link can walk, run, and attack, and he will automatically jump when running off of or reaching for a ledge. Link uses a sword and shield in combat, complemented with secondary weapons and items, including a bow and arrows, a boomerang, and bombs. While L-targeting, projectile-based weapons can be fired at a target without the need for manual aiming.

The context-sensitive button mechanic allows one button to serve a variety of functions, such as talking, opening doors, and pushing, pulling, and throwing objects. The on-screen display shows what action, if any, the button will trigger, determined by the situation. For example, if Link is holding a rock, the context-sensitive button will cause Link to throw the rock if he is moving or targeting an object or enemy, or place the rock on the ground if he is standing still.

The GameCube and Wii versions feature several minor differences in their controls. The Wii version of the game makes use of the motion sensors and built-in speaker of the Wii Remote. The speaker emits the sounds of a bowstring when shooting an arrow, Midna's laugh when she gives advice to Link, and the series' trademark "chime" when discovering secrets. The player controls Link's sword by swinging the Wii Remote. Other attacks are triggered using similar gestures with the Nunchuk. Unique to the GameCube version is the ability for the player to control the camera freely, without entering a special "lookaround" mode required by the Wii; however, in the GameCube version, only two of Link's secondary weapons can be equipped at a time, as opposed to four in the Wii version.

The game features nine dungeons—large, contained areas where Link battles enemies, collects items, and solves puzzles. Link navigates these dungeons and fights a boss at the end in order to obtain an item or otherwise advance the plot. The dungeons are connected by a large overworld, across which Link can travel on foot; on his horse, Epona; or by teleporting with Midna's assistance.

When Link enters the Twilight Realm, the void that corrupts parts of Hyrule, he transforms into a wolf. He is eventually able to transform between his Hylian and wolf forms at will. As a wolf, Link loses the ability to use his sword, shield, or any secondary items; he instead attacks by biting and defends primarily by dodging attacks. "Wolf Link" gains several key advantages in return—he moves faster than he does as a human (though riding Epona is still faster), digs holes to create new passages and uncover buried items, and has improved senses, including the ability to follow scent trails. On his back, he also carries Midna, a small imp-like creature who gives him hints, uses an energy field to attack enemies, helps him jump long distances, and eventually allows him to "warp" to any of several preset locations throughout the overworld. Using Link's wolf senses, the player can see and listen to the wandering spirits of those affected by the Twilight, as well as hunt for enemy ghosts named Poes.

The artificial intelligence (AI) of enemies in Twilight Princess is more advanced than that of enemies in The Wind Waker. Enemies react to defeated companions and to arrows or slingshot pellets that pass by, and they can detect Link from a greater distance than was possible in previous games.

Plot

The game begins with a teenage boy named Link, who works as a ranch hand in Ordon Village. One day, Bulblins take away the village's children. Link pursues and encounters a wall of Twilight. A Twilight monster pulls him beyond the wall into the Twilight-shrouded forest, where he is transformed into a wolf and imprisoned. Link is soon freed by a creature named Midna, who offers to help him if he obeys her unconditionally. She guides him to Princess Zelda, who explains that Zant, the Sorcerer/Usurper King of the Twili, invaded Hyrule Castle and forced her to surrender. The kingdom became enveloped in Twilight, turning all its inhabitants besides Link and Zelda into invisible spirits. To save Hyrule, Link, aided by Midna, must first revive the Light Spirits by entering the Twilight-covered regions and recovering the Spirits' light from the Twilight beings that had stolen it. Once revitalized, each Spirit returns Link to his Hylian form and informs Link and Midna of the hidden location of a Fused Shadow; one of the fragments of a powerful relic that will have to be used to match Zant's power to defeat him. During this time, the ghost of a departed swordsman, the Hero's Shade, also appears to provide swordsmanship training he had failed to pass on before his untimely death, as well as information regarding Link's destiny in Hyrule.

During his journey, Link also finds Ordon Village's children and assists the monkeys of Faron, the Gorons of Eldin, and the Zoras of Lanayru. After restoring the Light Spirits and obtaining the Fused Shadows, Link and Midna are ambushed by Zant, who takes away the fragments. Midna calls him out for abusing his tribe's magic, but Zant reveals that his power comes from another source, and he uses it to trap Link in his wolf state. Failing to persuade Midna into joining forces with him, Zant attempts to dispose of her by exposing her to the light of Lanayru's light spirit. Bringing a dying Midna to Zelda, Link learns from her that he needs the Master Sword to remove Zant's curse and she proceeds to sacrifice herself to heal Midna, vanishing mysteriously. Moved by Zelda's act of selflessness, Midna starts to care more about Link and the fate of his world.

After gaining the Master Sword, Link is cleansed of the curse that kept him in wolf form. Deep within the Gerudo Desert, Link and Midna search for the Mirror of Twilight, the only known gateway between Hyrule and the Twilight Realm, but discover that it is broken. The Sages there explain that Zant tried to destroy it, but only managed to shatter it into fragments; only the true ruler of the Twili can completely destroy the mirror. They also relate that they once used it to banish Ganondorf, the Gerudo leader who attempted to steal the Triforce, to the Twilight Realm after failing to execute him. Link and Midna set out to retrieve the missing shards of the mirror. Once it has been fully restored, the Sages reveal to Link that Midna is actually the true ruler of the Twili, usurped and cursed into her current form by Zant. Confronting Zant, Link and Midna learn that he forged a pact with Ganondorf, who asked for his assistance in subjugating Hyrule. After Link defeats Zant, Midna recovers the Fused Shadows and destroys Zant after learning that only Ganondorf's defeat can release her from her curse.

Returning to Hyrule, Link and Midna find Ganondorf in Hyrule Castle, with a lifeless Zelda suspended above him. Ganondorf fights Link by possessing Zelda and then transforming into a gigantic boar-like beast, but Link defeats him, and the power Midna received from Zelda is able to resuscitate her. Ganondorf revives, and Midna teleports Link and Zelda outside the castle so she can hold him off with the Fused Shadows. However, as Hyrule Castle collapses, Ganondorf emerges from it victorious, crushing the Fused Shadow piece that Midna wore on her head, and pursues Link on horseback. Assisted by Zelda and the Light Spirits, Link eventually knocks Ganondorf off his horse and duels him on foot before finishing him off with the Master Sword. With Ganondorf defeated, the Light Spirits revive Midna and restore her to her true form. After bidding farewell to Link and Zelda, Midna returns home and destroys the Mirror of Twilight, ultimately severing the link between Hyrule and the Twilight Realm. As Hyrule Castle is rebuilt, Link leaves Ordon Village, heading to parts unknown.

Development

Inception as a GameCube game

In 2003, Nintendo announced that a new The Legend of Zelda game was in the works for the GameCube by the same team that had created the cel-shaded The Wind Waker. At the following year's Game Developers Conference, director Eiji Aonuma unintentionally revealed that the game's sequel was in development under the working title The Wind Waker 2; it was set to use a similar graphical style to that of its predecessor. Nintendo of America told Aonuma that North American sales of The Wind Waker were sluggish because its cartoon appearance created the impression that the game was designed for a young audience. Concerned that the sequel would have the same problem, Aonuma expressed to producer Shigeru Miyamoto that he wanted to create a realistic Zelda game that would appeal to the North American market and meet Miyamoto's original vision of realism for the series.  Miyamoto, hesitant about solely changing the game's presentation, suggested the team's focus should instead be on coming up with gameplay innovations. He advised that Aonuma should start by doing what could not be done in Ocarina of Time, particularly horseback combat. Early development of what would become Twilight Princess began and special care was taken to improve the realism of the horseriding, with lead character designer Keisuke Nishimori riding a horse for himself to feel what it was like.

Just as the original Legend of Zelda game was inspired by J. R. R. Tolkien's The Lord of the Rings novels, the aesthetic of Twilight Princess was inspired by the Lord of the Rings films as they had just come out and were very popular at the time. The game was developed with having a large convincing world in mind, one with a vast scale to meet the expectation for fantasy worlds that audiences had become accustomed to with the Lord of the Rings.

In four months, Aonuma's team managed to present realistic horseback riding, which Nintendo later revealed to the public with a trailer at Electronic Entertainment Expo 2004 and was met with enormous praise. The game was scheduled to be released the next year and was no longer a follow-up to The Wind Waker; a true sequel to it was released for the Nintendo DS in 2007, in the form of Phantom Hourglass. Miyamoto explained in interviews that the graphical style was chosen to satisfy demand and that it better fit the theme of an older incarnation of Link. The game runs on a modified The Wind Waker engine.

Prior Zelda games have employed a theme of two separate, yet connected, worlds. In A Link to the Past, Link travels between a "Light World" and a "Dark World"; in Ocarina of Time, as well as in Oracle of Ages, Link travels between two different time periods. The Zelda team sought to reuse this motif in the series' latest installment. It was suggested that Link transform into a wolf, much like he metamorphoses into a rabbit in the Dark World of A Link to the Past. The concept for Link to transform into a wolf and its surrounding narrative elements came from a dream that Aonuma had while overseas on a business trip. He dreamt that he was a wolf, locked inside a cage, and, after he woke up, he was confused and disoriented and it took a while for him to remember where he was. The story of the game was created by Aonuma, and it later underwent several changes by scenario writers Mitsuhiro Takano and Aya Kyogoku. Takano created the script for the story scenes, while Kyogoku and Takayuki Ikkaku handled the actual in-game script. Originally, Link was planned to be a wolf from the game's start to bluntly contrast the Ocarina of Time formula, but this was changed so that new players could be eased into Zelda's traditional gameplay and narrative formula. The narrative premise in the story regarding the children of Ordon village getting kidnapped was an example of the game featuring darker story elements than any past iteration.

From a gameplay perspective, the "twilight world" portions of the game were vaguely inspired by the fact that prior Zelda games had always distinctively separated its dungeons from its overworld. It was wondered what the result would be if the players took a traditional Zelda dungeon and put it inside the open world instead. This resulted in the hunt for tears of light the player partakes in when in the twilight covered world. Regarding the atmosphere of the Twilight covered Hyrule, as well as the Twilight Realm dungeon later in the game, the intent was to make players feel uncomfortable. Special care was taken, however, to ensure that this was balanced right, so that it did not make the player so uncomfortable that they did not want to progress further or could not enjoy the experience.

Aonuma left his team working on the new idea while he produced The Minish Cap for the Game Boy Advance. When he returned, he found the Twilight Princess team struggling. Emphasis on the parallel worlds and the wolf transformation had made Link's character unbelievable. Aonuma also felt the gameplay lacked the caliber of innovation found in Phantom Hourglass, which was being developed with touch controls for the Nintendo DS. At the same time, the Wii was under development with the code name "Revolution". Miyamoto thought that the Revolution's pointing device, the Wii Remote, was well suited for aiming arrows in Zelda, and he suggested that Aonuma consider using it.

Transition to the Wii
Aonuma had anticipated creating a Zelda game for what would later be for the Wii, but had assumed that he would need to complete Twilight Princess first. His team began work developing a pointing-based interface for the bow and arrow, and Aonuma found that aiming directly at the screen gave the game a new feel, just like the DS control scheme for Phantom Hourglass. Aonuma felt confident this was the only way to proceed, but worried about consumers who had been anticipating a GameCube release. Developing two versions would mean delaying the previously announced 2005 release, still disappointing the consumer. Satoru Iwata felt that having both versions would satisfy users in the end, even though they would have to wait for the finished product. Aonuma then started working on both versions in parallel.

Transferring GameCube development to the Wii was relatively simple, since the Wii was being created to be compatible with the GameCube. At E3 2005, Nintendo released a small number of Nintendo DS game cards containing a preview trailer for Twilight Princess. They also announced that Zelda would appear on the Wii (then codenamed "Revolution"), but was not clear to the media if this meant Twilight Princess or a different game.

The team worked on a Wii control scheme, adapting camera control and the fighting mechanics to the new interface. A prototype was created that used a swinging gesture to control the sword from a first-person viewpoint, but was unable to show the variety of Link's movements. When the third-person view was restored, Aonuma thought it felt strange to swing the Wii Remote with the right hand to control the sword in Link's left hand, so the entire Wii version map was mirrored. Details about Wii controls began to surface in December 2005 when British publication NGC Magazine claimed that when a GameCube copy of Twilight Princess was played on the Revolution, it would give the player the option of using the Revolution controller. Miyamoto confirmed the Revolution controller-functionality in an interview with Nintendo of Europe and Time reported this soon after. However, support for the Wii controller did not make it into the GameCube release. At E3 2006, Nintendo confirmed that both versions would be available at the Wii launch, and had a playable version of Twilight Princess for the Wii. Later, the GameCube release was pushed back to a month after the launch of the Wii.

Nintendo staff members reported that demo users complained about the difficulty of the control scheme. Aonuma realized that his team had implemented Wii controls under the mindset of "forcing" users to adapt, instead of making the system intuitive and easy to use. He began rethinking the controls with Miyamoto to focus on comfort and ease. The camera movement was reworked and item controls were changed to avoid accidental button presses. In addition, the new item system required use of the button that had previously been used for the sword. To solve this, sword controls were transferred back to gestures—something E3 attendees had commented they would like to see. This reintroduced the problem of using a right-handed swing to control a left-handed sword attack. The team did not have enough time before release to rework Link's character model, so they instead flipped the entire game—everything was made a mirror image. Link was now right-handed, and references to "east" and "west" were reversed. The GameCube version, however, was left with the original orientation. The Twilight Princess player's guide focuses on the Wii version, but has a section in the back with mirror-image maps for GameCube users.

Music and sound
The game's score was composed by Toru Minegishi and Asuka Ohta, with series regular Koji Kondo serving as the sound supervisor. Minegishi took charge of composition and sound design in Twilight Princess, providing all field and dungeon music. For the trailers, three pieces were written by different composers, two of which were created by Mahito Yokota and Kondo. Michiru Ōshima created orchestral arrangements for the three compositions, later to be performed by an ensemble conducted by Taizo Takemoto. Kondo's piece was chosen as music for the E3 2005 trailer and for the demo movie after the title screen. Midna has the most voice acting—her on-screen dialogue is often accompanied by a babble of pseudo-speech, which was produced by scrambling English phrases sampled by Japanese voice actress Akiko Kōmoto.

Media requests at the trade show prompted Kondo to consider using orchestral music for the other tracks in the game as well, a notion reinforced by his preference for live instruments. He originally envisioned a full 50-person orchestra for action sequences and a string quartet for more "lyrical moments", though the final product used sequenced music instead. Kondo later cited the lack of interactivity that comes with orchestral music as one of the main reasons for the decision. Both six- and seven-track versions of the game's soundtrack were released on November 19, 2006, as part of a Nintendo Power promotion and bundled with replicas of the Master Sword and the Hylian Shield.

Technical vulnerability 
Following the discovery of a buffer overflow vulnerability in the Wii version of Twilight Princess, an exploit known as the "Twilight Hack" was developed, allowing the execution of custom code from a Secure Digital (SD) card on the console. A specifically designed save file would cause the game to load unsigned code, which could include Executable and Linkable Format (ELF) programs and homebrew Wii applications. Versions 3.3 and 3.4 of the Wii Menu prevented copying exploited save files onto the console until circumvention methods were discovered, and version 4.0 of the Wii Menu patched the vulnerability.

Wii U version

A high-definition remaster of the game, The Legend of Zelda: Twilight Princess HD, was developed by Tantalus Media for the Wii U. Announced during a Nintendo Direct presentation in November 2015, it features enhanced graphics and Amiibo functionality. The game was released worldwide in March 2016.

The idea for a high-definition version of Twilight Princess first originated during the production of The Legend of Zelda: Breath of the Wild. Nintendo experimented with an HD version of Twilight Princess running on Wii U development kits when trying to settle on a graphical style for the new game. This ultimately led to the production of The Wind Waker HD, whose success encouraged the Zelda team to pursue other high-definition remasters. After its release, which was developed internally at Nintendo in only six months, the Zelda team settled on an HD remaster of Twilight Princess. At the time, most of the Zelda team was preoccupied with Breath of the Wild, so Nintendo sought a partnership with an external development studio, the Australia-based Tantalus Media, to work on Twilight Princess HD.

According to Eiji Aonuma, who directed the original release and produced Twilight Princess HD, ensuring the remaster would take advantage of the Wii U GamePad was a point of focus early in the title's development. The control scheme used in the GameCube version was adapted for the remaster due to similarities between the button layouts of the two consoles' controllers. Aonuma considered underwater gameplay in the remaster significantly improved. Other enhancements include speeding up a handful of cutscenes that seemed overly long by modern standards and reducing repetitive gameplay elements, such as collecting Tears of Light while in the Twilight Realm. A commitment to "preserving the feel of the original" inspired several design decisions, such as keeping the frame rate at 30 frames per second. Tomomi Sano, the assistant director of the Wii U version, noted the degree of refinement the graphics would receive required much consideration: "When we created more precise models of objects to go with the higher resolution, we found that everything was too clear and we lost that soft and delicate atmosphere that you get in particular at twilight or with the light in a forest".

Certain bundles of the game contain a Wolf Link Amiibo figurine, which unlocks a Wii U-exclusive dungeon called the "Cave of Shadows" and can carry data over to The Legend of Zelda: Breath of the Wild. In the Cave of Shadows, Link fights waves of enemies while restricted to his wolf form. Comparable to the optional "Cave of Ordeals" present in the original release, opportunities to recover health during the trial are sparse. Other Zelda-related Amiibo figurines have distinct functions: Link and Toon Link replenish arrows, Zelda and Sheik restore Link's health, and Ganondorf causes Link to take twice as much damage. A CD containing 20 musical selections from the game was available as a GameStop preorder bonus in North America; it is included with the limited-edition bundle in other regions. A three-disc original soundtrack consisting of 108 pieces from the game was released in Japan in July 2016.

Reception

Reviews

Twilight Princess was released to critical acclaim and commercial success. It received perfect scores from major publications such as 1UP.com, Computer and Video Games, Electronic Gaming Monthly, Game Informer, GamesRadar and GameSpy. On the review aggregator Metacritic, Twilight Princess holds scores of 95/100 for the Wii version and 96/100 for the GameCube version, indicating "universal acclaim". It is the highest-rated game of 2006 on Metacritic. GameTrailers in their review called it one of the greatest games ever created.

On release, Twilight Princess was considered to be the greatest Zelda game ever made by many critics including writers for 1UP.com, Computer and Video Games, Electronic Gaming Monthly, Game Informer, GamesRadar, IGN and The Washington Post. Game Informer called it "so creative that it rivals the best that Hollywood has to offer". GamesRadar praised Twilight Princess as "a game that deserves nothing but the absolute highest recommendation". Cubed3 hailed Twilight Princess as "the single greatest videogame experience". Twilight Princess graphics were praised for the art style and animation, although the game was designed for the GameCube, which is technically lacking compared to the next generation consoles. Both IGN and GameSpy pointed out the existence of blurry textures and low-resolution characters. Despite these complaints, Computer and Video Games felt the game's atmosphere was superior to that of any previous Zelda game and regarded Twilight Princess Hyrule as the best version ever created. PALGN praised the game's cinematics, noting that "the cutscenes are the best ever in Zelda games". Regarding the Wii version, GameSpots Jeff Gerstmann said the Wii controls felt "tacked-on", although 1UP.com said the remote-swinging sword attacks were "the most impressive in the entire series". Gaming Nexus considered Twilight Princess soundtrack to be the best of this generation, though IGN criticized its MIDI-formatted songs for lacking "the punch and crispness" of their orchestrated counterparts.

Wii U version 
Twilight Princess HD holds a score of 86/100 at the review aggregator Metacritic, indicating "generally favorable" reviews. The title received the Nintendo Game of the Year award at the Golden Joystick Awards in November 2016.

Awards
Twilight Princess received the awards for Best Artistic Design, Best Original Score, and Best Use of Sound from IGN for its GameCube version. Both IGN and Nintendo Power gave Twilight Princess the awards for Best Graphics and Best Story. It also received the 2007 award for "Outstanding Achievement in Story and Character Development" from the Academy of Interactive Arts & Sciences. Twilight Princess received Game of the Year awards from GameTrailers, 1UP.com, Electronic Gaming Monthly, Game Informer, GamesRadar, GameSpy, Spacey Awards, X-Play and Nintendo Power. It was also given awards for Best Adventure Game from the Game Critics Awards, X-Play, IGN, GameTrailers, 1UP.com, and Nintendo Power. The game was considered the Best Console Game by the Game Critics Awards and GameSpy. The game placed 16th in Official Nintendo Magazines list of the 100 Greatest Nintendo Games of All Time. IGN ranked the game as the 4th-best Wii game. Nintendo Power ranked the game as the third-best game to be released on a Nintendo system in the 2000s decade.

Sales 
In North America, the game was sold with three of every four Wii purchases during its first week. The Wii version sold 412,000 copies in the United States during November 2006, representing 87% of Wii launch sales that month, the highest attach rate for a launch game since Super Mario 64 launched with the Nintendo 64 in 1996. It went on to become America's fifth best-selling game of 2006 with  copies sold for the Wii and GameCube in the US that year. In the United Kingdom, the Wii version received a Platinum sales award from the Entertainment and Leisure Software Publishers Association (ELSPA), indicating sales of at least 300,000 copies in the UK.

The game had sold 5.82 million copies on the Wii , and 1.32 million on the GameCube . , the game had sold 8.85 million copies worldwide across both platforms, making it the best-selling single title in the series until it was surpassed by The Legend of Zelda: Breath of the Wild (2017).

Wii U version 
The remaster sold 52,282 copies during its first week of release in Japan, which placed it at second place in the video game sales charts. The following week, it came in at number 9 on the charts, selling an additional 7,705 copies. By comparison, 30,264 copies of The Wind Waker HD were sold in its first week in Japan. In the first week of Twilight Princess HDs United Kingdom release, the remaster was the second best-selling game and the best-selling game released for a single platform in the country. Twilight Princess HDs sales dropped 84% in its second week in the U.K., making it the ninth best-selling game in the country. In the United States, it was the third best-selling game sold in brick-and-mortar retailers throughout March 2016, according to market-research firm The NPD Group. As of December 31, 2020, the game has sold 1.15 million copies worldwide.

Legacy
An 11-volume manga series based on Twilight Princess, penned and illustrated by Akira Himekawa, was first released in Japan on February 8, 2016 and ran until January 30, 2022. The series is available solely via publisher Shogakukan's MangaOne mobile application. While the manga adaptation began almost ten years after the initial release of the game on which it is based, it launched only a month before the release of the high-definition remake. Viz Media began releasing an English localization of the series in 2017.

To commemorate the launch of the My Nintendo loyalty program in March 2016, Nintendo released My Nintendo Picross: The Legend of Zelda: Twilight Princess, a Picross puzzle game developed by Jupiter for download to the Nintendo 3DS.

Midna, in both her imp and Twili forms, Zant, and NPC character Agitha, all appeared as playable warriors in the Zelda crossover title Hyrule Warriors and its various iterations. Since the release of Hyrule Warriors, Agitha has been recognised as a "main character" of Twilight Princess.

See also
 Link's Crossbow Training, a 2007 shooting video game created for the Wii Zapper, using the world and assets of Twilight Princess

Notes

References

External links
 

2006 video games
Action-adventure games
Dark fantasy video games
Fantasy video games
Video games about curses
Twilight Princess
Nintendo Entertainment Analysis and Development games
GameCube games
Open-world video games
Video games about shapeshifting
Single-player video games
Video games about dogs
Video games about spirit possession
Video games developed in Japan
Video games featuring female protagonists
Video games featuring non-playable protagonists
Video games about parallel universes
Werewolf video games
Video games about demons
Video games produced by Shigeru Miyamoto
Video games scored by Toru Minegishi
Wii games